The 2011 World Women's Handball Championship was the 20th edition of the international championship tournament in women's Team sport handball that is governed by the International Handball Federation (IHF). Brazil hosted the event from 2–18 December 2011.

On 18 December 2011, Norway successfully contested France 32–24 in the final. Norway was the second team to achieve a triple title cache all in the same tournament by winning the World Championship, European Championship and Olympic Games titles. Denmark had made this achievement previously. France lost, its second consecutive World Championship final (2009), to Russia.

Norway automatically qualified for the 2012 Olympic Handball tournament and 2013 World Championship. When Norway vacated their European Championship and that tournament's second place team, Sweden, automatically qualifying for the Olympics.

Spain successfully contested Denmark 24–18 in the final for the bronze and won their inaugural tournament medal. For fifth place, host nation Brazil achieved their best place at any previous tournament successfully knocking out the 2009 defending champions, Russia, 36–20.

Venues 
The competition took place in the Brazilian state of São Paulo. It is the third women's World Championship organized outside of Europe, after South Korea in 1990 and China in 2009.

Initially, the matches had to take place in the state of Santa Catarina.

Four cities had been selected to host the matches:

Qualification
Host nation
 

Defending champions
 

Qualified from the 2010 African Championship
 
 
 

Qualified from the 2010 European Championship
 
 
 

Qualified from the 2010 Asian Championship

Qualified from the 2011 American Championship

Qualified from the 2011 Oceania Championship

Qualified from European play-offs
 
 
 
 
 
 
 
 

Eight European teams qualified for the World Championships through play-offs. The draw was made on 19 December. The first match leg were played on 4-5 June with the second legs on 11-12 June.

|}

Squads

Group draw
The draw was held on 2 July 2011 at 21:00 local time.

Seeding
The seeding was announced on 24 June.

TH = Title Holder

Group stage
A provisional scheduled was released on 24 June. Brazil played the opening game on 2 December. On 7 July the venues for each preliminary round were announced by the IHF. The detailed match schedule was released on 31 August. As all Handball world championships, the tie-breakers in case of point tie betwin two or more teams were: 1.Points in matches between tied teams  2. Goal difference in matches between tied teams  3. Goaldifference in all group matches  4. Most scored goals in all group matches, 5. Draw.

All times are local (UTC−2).

Group A
Angola won the tie-break for second place due to a better record in matches between them, Montenegro and Iceland. In those direct encounters all three got 2 points but Angola's +2 goal difference beat Montenegro's +1 and Iceland's –3.

Group B

Group C

Group D

Knockout stage 
Championship bracket

5th place bracket

Round of 16

Quarterfinals

5th–8th semifinals

Semifinals

Seventh place match

Fifth place match

Third place match

Final

President's Cup
Fifth and sixth place finishers from the group compete in the President's Cup to determine the places 17 through 24.

Places 17 to 20

Places 21 to 24

23rd place match

21st place match

19th place match

17th place match

Statistics

Top goalscorers

Source: IHF.info

Top goalkeepers

Source: IHF.info

Ranking and awards
No placement matches for places 9 to 16 were played, but as those places might be decisive for qualification to the Olympics, the regulations ranked those teams. The losing teams of the Round of 16 were ranked based on a their group stage record (points, goal-difference, goals scored) against teams placed 1st to 4th (those advancing to the Round of 16).

Final ranking

All Star Team
Goalkeeper: 
Left wing: 
Left back: 
Pivot: 
Centre back: 
Right back: 
Right wing: 
Chosen by team officials and IHF experts: IHF.info

Other awards
Top scorer:

References

External links

 IHF Site

World Handball Championship tournaments
World Women's Handball Championship 2011
World Women's Handball Championship
World Women's Handball Championship, 2011
Women's handball in Brazil
December 2011 sports events in South America